David Nichols may refer to:
Dave Nichols (c. 1963–1996), musician
David A. Nichols (1917–1997), judge of the Maine Supreme Judicial Court
David C. Nichols (born 1950), U.S. naval officer
David E. Nichols (born 1944), American pharmacologist and medicinal chemist
David Eccles Nichols (1873–1962), violist
David H. Nichols (1826–1900), Colorado Lieutenant Governor

See also
Dave Nichol (1940–2013), Canadian product marketing expert
David Nicholls (disambiguation)
David Nicholl (disambiguation)
David Nicolle (born 1944), British historian